Nelson Alejandro Pinto Martínez (born February 1, 1981) is a Chilean former footballer.

Career
He played five years with Chilean club Universidad de Chile. He made 110 caps with the Chilean squad and scored eight goals before making the move to Mexico before the clasura tournament 2005.

Pinto played for Chile at the 2001 FIFA World Youth Championship in Argentina.

Post retirement
After his retirement Pinto played for the amateur club Unión Veterana and since 2017 has played for the Chile national minifootball team alongside others former footballers such as Pablo Duque and Juan Carlos Muñoz, winning the 2018 PAN AM Cup in Guatemala and taking part at the 2017 World Cup and at the 2018 Confederations Cup in Tunisia. In addition to this, he has played futsal for Universidad de Chile, winning the 2017 tournament.

Honours

Club
Universidad de Chile
 Primera División de Chile (1): 2004 Apertura

Universidad de Chile (futsal)
 Campeonato Nacional (1): 2017

International
Chile (minifootball)
 PAN AM Cup (1): 2018

References

External links

Nelson Pinto at playmakerstats.com (English version of ceroacero.es)

1981 births
Living people
Footballers from Santiago
Chilean footballers
Chilean expatriate footballers
Chile international footballers
Chile under-20 international footballers
Universidad de Chile footballers
Tecos F.C. footballers
Santiago Morning footballers
Club Deportivo Palestino footballers
Liga MX players
Chilean Primera División players
Expatriate footballers in Mexico
Chilean expatriate sportspeople in Mexico
Association football midfielders
Chilean men's futsal players